Lyonsifusus is a genus of sea snails, marine gastropod mollusks in the subfamily Fusininae  of the family Fasciolariidae, the spindle snails and tulip snails.

Species
 Lyonsifusus ansatus (Gmelin, 1791)
 Lyonsifusus carvalhoriosi (Macsotay & Campos, 2001)

References

 Vermeij G.J. & Snyder M.A. (2018). Proposed genus-level classification of large species of Fusininae (Gastropoda, Fasciolariidae). Basteria. 82(4-6): 57-82.

Fasciolariidae